The Petite rivière Port-Daniel (English: Little River Port-Daniel) flows in the administrative region of Gaspésie–Îles-de-la-Madeleine, Quebec, Canada. More specifically, this river successively crosses the regional county municipalities of:
 MRC of Bonaventure Regional County Municipality: the unorganized territory of Rivière-Bonaventure (township of Honorat), the municipality of Saint-Godefroi and the municipality of Shigawake;
 MRC Le Rocher-Percé Regional County Municipality: the municipality of Port-Daniel–Gascons ("Rivière-Port-Daniel" sector).

The "Petite rivière Port-Daniel" is a tributary of the bay of Port-Daniel, located on the north shore of the Chaleur Bay; the latter in turn opens eastward onto the Gulf of St. Lawrence.

Geography 

The "Petite rivière Port-Daniel" takes its source from mountain streams in the south-eastern part of the canton of Honorat which is part of the unorganized territory of Rivière-Bonaventure.

This source is located on the southern slope of the dividing line; the Hall River drains the West and North slopes; the rivière Port-Daniel du Milieu drains the eastern slope. The upper part of the “Petite rivière Port-Daniel” flows more or less parallel to the east side of the Hall river.

This source of the river is located at:
  south-west of the western limit of the township of Weir, located in the unorganized territory of Rivière-Bonaventure;
  north of the limit of the municipality of Shigawake;
  southwest of the limit of the MRC of Le Rocher-Percé Regional County Municipality;
  Northwest of the route 132 bridge which spans the mouth of the Petit Barachois located at the confluence of the "Petite rivière-Port- Daniel ".

From its source, the "Petite rivière Port-Daniel" flows on  towards the south, then the east, especially in forest and mountainous areas, divided into the following segments:

Upper course of the river (segment of )
  towards the south, up to the northern limit of the municipality of Saint-Godefroi;
  towards the south, up to the confluence of the See stream (coming from the north-west);
  towards the south, then towards the east, until the confluence of a stream (coming from the north);
  northeasterly, up to the limit of the municipality of Shigawake;
  towards the south-east, forming a curve towards the east, until the confluence of the brook of the Sellette (coming from the west).

Lower course of the river (segment of )
  eastward, up to the confluence of a stream (coming from the southwest);
  eastward, up to the confluence of a stream (coming from the north);
  towards the east, then towards the south, until the confluence of a stream (coming from the southwest);
  eastward, up to the limit of the municipality of Port-Daniel–Gascons;
  eastward, to the confluence of Rankin Creek (coming from the north);
  towards the east, forming a curve towards the south, to the confluence of the Portes de l'Enfer stream (coming from the northwest);
  towards the east, forming a curve towards the south, until the confluence of the Langlois stream (coming from the southwest) which flows to the south of the hamlet of Clemville;
  towards the east, winding up to the confluence of a stream (coming from the northwest);
  eastward, to the Canadian National railway bridge which is located on the northwest shore of a small barachois;
  eastward, to the mouth of the Petit Barachois, the mouth of which is delimited by the route 132.

This small barachois empties on the northeast side into the "Baie de Port-Daniel" passing under the bridge of route 132, which opens towards the South-East in the Chaleur Bay.

The confluence of the river is located on the north side of the village of Port-Daniel-Center, on the southwest side of the village of Port-Daniel-Est and to the southwest of the barachois of Rivière-Port-Daniel.

Toponymy 

The toponym "Petite rivière Port-Daniel" was made official on December 5, 1968, at the Commission de toponymie du Québec.

References 

Rivers of Gaspésie–Îles-de-la-Madeleine
Regional county municipalities in Gaspésie–Îles-de-la-Madeleine